Alexandru Zaharescu (born June 4, 1961) is a Romanian mathematician. He is a professor in the Department of Mathematics, University of Illinois at Urbana–Champaign, and a Senior Researcher at the Institute of Mathematics of the Romanian Academy. He has two PhDs in mathematics, one from the University of Bucharest in 1991 under the direction of Nicolae Popescu, the other from Princeton University in 1995 under the direction of Peter Sarnak. Zaharescu has numerous publications in highly prestigious journals, and more than 300 in total. Almost all his work is in number theory.

Early life
Zaharescu was born on June 4, 1961 and grew up in Codlea, Romania. He graduated from high school in Codlea in 1980, and from the University of Bucharest in 1986. He joined the Institute of Mathematics of the Romanian Academy in 1989, and in 1991 he received a PhD from the University of Bucharest.

Career
Zaharescu received his second PhD from Princeton University in 1995. After that, he has held temporary positions at the Massachusetts Institute of Technology,  McGill University, the Institute for Advanced Study,
before joining the faculty at the University of Illinois in 2000.

Awards and honours
Zaharescu was elected a Fellow of the American Mathematical Society in 2017, for contributions to analytic number theory. A conference in honor of his 60th birthday was held in June 2021 at the Institute of Mathematics of the Romanian Academy.

Notes

External links
 Simion Stoilow Institute of Mathematics of the Romanian Academy
 2017 Class of Fellows of the AMS
 UIUC webpage of Alexandru Zaharescu

Living people
1961 births
People from Codlea
20th-century Romanian mathematicians
21st-century Romanian mathematicians
20th-century American mathematicians
21st-century American mathematicians
Romanian inventors
21st-century inventors
Number theorists
University of Bucharest alumni
Princeton University alumni
Romanian emigrants to the United States
University of Illinois Urbana-Champaign faculty
Fellows of the American Mathematical Society